The Great Comet of 1882 formally designated C/1882 R1, 1882 II, and 1882b, was a comet which became very bright in September 1882. It was a member of the Kreutz Sungrazers, a family of comets which pass within  of the Sun's photosphere at perihelion.
The comet was bright enough to be visible next to the Sun in the daytime sky at its perihelion.

Discovery 
The comet appeared in the morning skies of September 1882. Reports suggest that it was first seen as early as 1 September 1882, from the Cape of Good Hope as well as the Gulf of Guinea, and over the next few days many observers in the southern hemisphere reported the new comet.

The first astronomer to record observations of the comet was W. H. Finlay, the Chief Assistant at the Royal Observatory in Cape Town, South Africa. Finlay's observation on 7 September at 16h GMT was also an independent discovery, and he reported that the comet had an apparent magnitude of about 3, and a tail about a degree in length.

The comet brightened rapidly, and within days had become an exceptionally bright object. Her Majesty's Astronomer at the Cape, David Gill, reported watching the comet rise a few minutes before the Sun on 18 September, and described it as "The nucleus was then undoubtedly single, and certainly rather under than over 4″ in diameter; in fact, as I have described it, it resembled very much a star of the 1st magnitude seen by daylight." 4″ is 4/60 of a minute of arc, and a minute is 1/60 of a degree.

Perihelion 
The comet was rapidly approaching perihelion when it was first seen.
Subsequent orbital studies have determined that it was a Sungrazing comet, one which passes extremely close to the surface of the Sun.
For many hours on either side of its perihelion passage, the comet was easily visible in the daytime sky next to the Sun.
It reached an estimated magnitude of −17.

Shortly after perihelion was reached on 17 September, the comet transited the Sun.
At the Cape, Finlay observed the comet with the aid of a neutral density filter right up until the moment of transit, when the Sun's limb was "boiling all about it".
Finlay noted that the comet disappeared from view very suddenly, and no trace of it could be seen against the Sun's surface.

Post-perihelion evolution 
After its perihelion passage, the comet moved into dark skies, and although it faded as it receded from the Sun it remained one of the most prominent objects in the sky. On 30 September, observers, including Finlay and E. E. Barnard, began to notice that the comet's nucleus was elongated and broken into two pronounced bright balls of light, and by 17 October it was clear that it had broken into at least five fragments. Observers reported that the relative brightness of the fragments varied from day to day.

In mid-October, the comet developed a notable antitail, pointing towards the Sun. Anti-tails are a fairly common cometary phenomenon, and result from orbital geometry giving the appearance of a tail pointing towards the Sun although material can only be driven away from the Sun.

The nucleus reached its maximum apparent size in December 1882. The comet faded gradually, but despite its fragmentation it remained visible to the naked eye until February 1883. The last definite sighting of the comet was made by B. A. Gould at Córdoba on 1 June 1883.

Orbital studies 
Studies of the orbit of the comet showed that the Great Comet of 1882 was moving on an almost identical path to previous great comets seen in C/1843 D1 and C/1880 C1. These comets had also suddenly appeared in the morning sky and had passed extremely close to the Sun at perihelion. One suggestion was that all three were in fact the same comet, with an orbital period that was being drastically shortened at each perihelion passage. However, studies showed this to be untenable, as the orbital period of this comet is 772 ± 3 years and the others are 600–800 years.

Heinrich Kreutz studied the orbits of the three great comets, and developed the idea that the three comets were fragments of a much larger progenitor comet which had broken up at an earlier perihelion passage. The fragmentation of the Great Comet of 1882 itself demonstrated that this was plausible. It is now thought that the Great Comet of 1882 is a fragment of X/1106 C1, and that Comet du Toit (C/1945 X1) and Comet Ikeya–Seki (C/1965 S1) are two of its sister fragments.

It is now well established that the comets C/1843 D1, C/1880 C1, C/1882 R1, C/1887 B1, C/1963 R1, C/1965 S1, and C/1970 K1 are all members of a family known as the Kreutz Sungrazers, which are all descended from one comet. Current models do not support the frequent supposition in the prior literature that the famous comet of 372 BC is in fact the ultimate parent of the Sungrazers. The comet of 372 BC is often associated with Aristotle who, along with others from his time, described that comet in his writings. However, Aristotle was only twelve at the time of the comet's appearance and the historian, Callisthenes of Olynthus, who also wrote about it was born ten years after its appearance. Consequently, their reports should not be taken as eyewitness accounts. Further, there is no mention of the comet in Chinese literature of the time. Instead either the comet of February 423 or of February 467 with orbital periods of around 700 years is now considered the likely progenitor of the Sungrazers. The fragments of the Great Comet of 1882 will return in several hundred years' time, spread out over perhaps two or three centuries.

Notes

References

External links 

Cometography.com

Destroyed comets
Kreutz Sungrazers
18820901
Great comets
Long-period comets